Daphne and Chloe (Spanish: Dafnis y Cloe) is a painting by award-winning Filipino painter and revolutionary activist Juan Luna. Created in the academic style by the artist after being exposed to the works of art of Renaissance master painters in Rome, Daphne and Chloe won Luna a silver palette from the Liceo Artistico de Manila (Artistic Lyceum of Manila).

References

Paintings by Juan Luna
Works based on Daphnis and Chloe